Alexandre Riabko (born 20 February 1978) is a Ukrainian ballet dancer, and a principal dancer of the Hamburg Ballet.

Alexandre Riabko was born in Kyiv, and trained at the Kyiv Ballet School under Vladimir Denisenko. After reaching the finals of the Prix de Lausanne, he continued his studies at the School of the Hamburg Ballet with Anatoli Nisnevich and Kevin Haigen. He joined the Hamburg Ballet in 1996 and was promoted to soloist in 1999 and principal dancer in 2001. In 2016 he was awarded a special Prix Benois de la Danse for excellence in partnering.

Riabko is married to fellow Hamburg Ballet principal dancer and frequent stage partner Silvia Azzoni, and they are parents of a daughter.

Repertoire
Ballets by John Neumeier
 Giselle (after Jean Coralli and Jules Perrot): Albert, peasant pas de deux (first interpreter)
 The Sleeping Beauty (after Marius Petipa): Prince Désiré, Catalabutte, Bluebird
 The Nutcracker: Drosselmeier, Günther, Fritz
 Illusions – like 'Swan Lake''' (utilizing choreography by Marius Petipa and Lev Ivanov): The King, Count Alexander
 Nijinsky: Vaslav Nijinsky, Arlequin/Spirit of the Rose (first interpreter)
 Le Pavillon d’Armide: The Man, Vaslav Nijinsky (first interpreter)
 Purgatorio: creator spiritus (first interpreter)
 A Midsummer Night's Dream: Theseus/Oberon, Philostrat/Puck, Demetrius
 Romeo and Juliet: Mercutio
 Othello: Jago
 As You Like It: Orlando
 VIVALDI or What You Will: Sir Andrew
 Don Juan: title role
 The Lady of the Camellias: Armand Duval, Des Grieux
 The Little Mermaid: Edvard/The Prince, Sea Witch
 Peer Gynt: Flying Aspect, Aggression Aspect
 The Seagull: Konstantin Triplev
 Death in Venice: Aschenbach’s Concept (first interpreter)
 A Cinderella Story: Prince
 Orpheus: title role
 Sylvia: Aminta, Eros/Thyrsis/Orion
 Odyssey: War
 Parzival: title role
 The Saga of King Arthur: Mordred
 The Legend of Joseph: Joseph
 Christmas Oratorio: Angel, Shepherd
 Saint Matthew Passion Messiah (world premiere)
 Requiem Duse: The Mentor (Arrigo Boito)
 The Third Symphony of Gustav Mahler: The Man
 Preludes CV: Sascha (first interpreter)
 Winterreise (world premiere)
 Seven Haiku of the Moon: Contemplator of the Moon (first interpreter at the Hamburg Ballet)
 Spring and FallBallets by other choreographers
 La Sylphide (choreography: Pierre Lacotte): James
 Napoli (choreography: Lloyd Riggins, after August Bournonville): Gennaro (first interpreter at the Hamburg Ballet)
 La Bayadère (choreography: Natalia Makarova, after Marius Petipa): Solor
 La Fille mal gardée (choreography: Frederick Ashton): Colas (first interpreter at the Hamburg Ballet)
 Onegin (choreography: John Cranko): title role (first interpreter at the Hamburg Ballet)
 The Prodigal Son (choreography: George Balanchine): title role
 Light Beings (choreography: Mats Ek): The Knight
 Thaïs pas de deux (choreography: Frederick Ashton)
 Jewels (choreography: George Balanchine): Emeralds, Rubies (first interpreter at the Hamburg Ballet)
 Dances at a Gathering (choreography: Jerome Robbins): Man in Brown
 Forgotten Land (choreography: Jiří Kylián)
 Bella Figura (choreography: Jiří Kylián)
 Remanso (choreography: Nacho Duato)
 Polyphonia (choreography: Christopher Wheeldon; Hamburg Ballet premiere)
 Trio (choreography: Sidi Larbi Cherkaoui)

Filmography
 Illusions – like 'Swan Lake' (choreography: John Neumeier), Hamburg Ballet, 2001: as Count Alexander
 Death in Venice (choreography: John Neumeier), Hamburg Ballet, 2004: as Aschenbach’s Concept
 Saint Matthew Passion (choreography: John Neumeier), Hamburg Ballet, 2005
 'Pizzicato Polka' (choreography: John Neumeier), Vienna New Year's Concert, 2006
 Nijinsky'' (choreography: John Neumeier), Hamburg Ballet, 2017: as Nijinsky

References

External links
 Alexandre Riabko's page on the Hamburg Ballet website

1978 births
Living people
Ukrainian male ballet dancers
Dancers from Kyiv
Prix Benois de la Danse winners